San Luis Somos Todos is a continental cycling team based in Argentina that participates in UCI Continental Circuits races. The team was founded in 2012.

The disbanded at the end of the 2016 season.

Roster

Major wins

2012
Stage 2 Vuelta a Bolivia, Leandro Messineo
Stage 9a Vuelta a Bolivia, Daniel Díaz
2013
 Time Trial Championships, Leandro Messineo
Overall Tour de San Luis, Daniel Díaz
Stage 5, Emanuel Guevara
Stage 3 Vuelta a Bolivia, TTT
Stage 4 Vuelta a Bolivia, Jorge Giacinti
2014
 Road Race Championships, Daniel Díaz
2015
 Road Race Championships, Daniel Juarez
Stages 6 & 7 Vuelta a Costa Rica,  Mauro Richeze
2016
Stage 8 Vuelta a la Independencia Nacional, Mauro Richeze

References

UCI Continental Teams (America)
Cycling teams based in Argentina
Cycling teams established in 2012